The 1936 United States presidential election in Tennessee took place on November 3, 1936, as part of the 1936 United States presidential election. Tennessee voters chose 11 representatives, or electors, to the Electoral College, who voted for president and vice president.

Tennessee was won by incumbent President Franklin D. Roosevelt (D–New York), running with Vice President John Nance Garner, with 68.78% of the popular vote, against Governor Alf Landon (R–Kansas), running with Frank Knox, with 30.81% of the popular vote. As of the 2020 presidential election, this election constitutes the last occasion when Bradley County and Greene County voted for a Democratic presidential candidate.

Results

Results by county

Notes

References

Tennessee
1936
1936 Tennessee elections